Johnny Kay (born John Kaciuban, 23 June 1940 – 9 July 2022) was a guitarist from Chester, Pennsylvania. He is most widely known as one of the guitarists for the early rock 'n' roll group Bill Haley & His Comets from 1960-1968.

Background
After a brief audition where band members heard him play the guitar solo to the song "Rock Around the Clock", Kay was asked by Bill Haley to join his band, the Comets, in June 1960 when he was only 19 years old. Kay replaced previous guitarist Franny Beecher, who had quit the band in order to launch his own record label. 

Kay left the band in 1966 as Haley's brand of rockabilly continued to decline in popularity, but he returned in the early 1970s for an aborted world tour. He also appeared at the performance of Bill Haley & His Comets at the London Rock and Roll Show at Wembley Stadium, Wembley Park, London, England on 5 August 1972. In the film of the concert, Kay can be seen playing while wearing a pirate-like eye patch (he was recovering from surgery at the time).

Releases

In 2009, the German Hydra Records label released the album Bill Haley & Friends, Vol.4 - Johnny Kay - Tale Of A Comet as 27139.

Sources
Jim Dawson, Rock Around the Clock: The Record That Started the Rock Revolution! (San Francisco: Backbeat Books, 2005).
John W. Haley and John von Hoelle, Sound and Glory (Wilmington, Delaware: Dyne-American, 1990).
John Swenson, Bill Haley (London: W.H. Allen, 1982).

References

1940 births
Living people
American rock guitarists
American male guitarists
Bill Haley & His Comets members
20th-century American guitarists